Blitzcat is a 1989 novel by Robert Westall, and recipient of the Nestlé Smarties Book Prize.

Plot 
Blitzcat is told through the point of view of a black domestic cat, called Lord Gort, as she travels across England during the Blitz in search of her owner, who is serving with the RAF. The story includes a detailed depiction of the bombing of Coventry.

Reception
In 1989, Blitzcat was named winner of the Smarties Book Prize in the 9 – 11 years category.
In 1994, the American Library Association named Blitzcat as one of their 100 Best Books for Young Adults of the previous 25 years.

Publishers Weekly wrote "Sensitive readers will realize at once that the story of Lord Gort is one of those tales that, once begun, demands to be finished." and "Each of these glimpses of men and women in wartime is as perfect as a pearl; Lord Gort's journey is the single black thread on which the precious beads are strung."

It has been studied at school and appears on reading lists.

References

1989 British novels
1989 children's books
British children's novels
Children's historical novels
Novels set during World War II
Macmillan Publishers books
Children's novels about animals
Novels about cats
British children's books